A bear hug is a move in wrestling.

Bear Hug may also refer to:

Bear Hug, play by Robin French
Bear Hug, 1964 Loopy de Loop cartoon
"Bear Hug", song by Fun Lovin' Criminals from Come Find Yourself 1996
"Bear Hug", single by The 2 Bears 2011,  number 187 on the UK Singles Chart